Niyomiya Barta is an Indian Assamese language daily newspaper. The newspaper was launched on 4 March 2011. It is published simultaneously from Guwahati, Dibrugarh, Biswanath Chariali and Goalpara of Assam. Niyomiya Barta is run and published by Pride East Entertainment Private Limited.

The head office of this newspaper is located at News Live Building, Christian Basti, Guwahati.

See also
Dainik Janambhumi
Asomiya Pratidin
Amar Asom
Asomiya Khabar

References

External links

Assamese-language newspapers
Publications established in 2011
2011 establishments in Assam